Ethnic option is a term coined by sociologist Mary C. Waters  to express her conception that ethnic identity of the descendants of white European immigrants is flexible, symbolic and voluntary, not a definitive aspect of their identity. Waters argues that with the achievement of middle-class suburban status, ethnicity becomes a lifestyle option, a costless form of community.

See also
Acting white
Cultural appropriation
European Americans
Symbolic ethnicity
White ethnic

References

American middle class
Ethnicity
Middle class culture
Suburban culture
White American culture